Longview is a village in southern Alberta, Canada. Highwood River flows west of the village.

Longview is known for its view west toward the first range of the Rocky Mountains, its cattle ranching heritage and its natural resources (principally oil), but more importantly the open spaces, rivers (the Highwood) and some of the finest beef by most standards.

Longview is also known as the home of late Canadian Country Music star Ian Tyson.

Demographics 

In the 2016 Census of Population conducted by Statistics Canada, the Village of Longview recorded a population of 307 living in 140 of its 151 total private dwellings, which represents no change from its 2011 population of 307.

History 
The Long brothers, Thomas and Oliver, homesteaded at Big Hill, not far from where the village is now. Their last name combined with the view from the then post office, which was opened in 1908, is how the village was named.  When the oilfields at Turner Valley were revived in 1936, Longview became known as Little New York.  Little New York,  had a sister town uphill to the north called Little Chicago. No one seems to know how Little Chicago and Little New York got their names and both towns actually grew up over night. In 1936 there was nothing there but an empty prairie field. Then, in 1937, oil was discovered at the  level and people, most of them long out of work because of the great depression, came flocking and Little Chicago and Little New York were born. Buildings appeared like mushrooms. For the first time in years, men who without so much as a coat on their backs or a nickel in their pockets had the first money they had earned since the depression began. Today Little Chicago is gone and except a monument near the Cowboy Trail to the north of the village, little remains to show it ever existed. Little New York was more fortunate, as it is now the village of Longview.

In 1991, Clint Eastwood's Academy Award-winning film Unforgiven was filmed in and around Longview, as was the television film starring Tom Selleck, Monte Walsh.

Gallery

See also 
List of communities in Alberta
List of villages in Alberta

References

External links 

1964 establishments in Alberta
Villages in Alberta